The 2019 Rugby Challenge – known as the SuperSport Rugby Challenge for sponsorship reasons – was the 2019 season of the Rugby Challenge, the secondary domestic rugby union competition in South Africa. It was the third edition of the competition organised by the South African Rugby Union and was played between 27 April and 22 June 2019. These teams were divided into two sections, with eight teams playing in each of the North Section and the South Section.

Competition rules and information

Each team in the competition played the other teams in their section once during the pool stage, either at home or away. The top two teams in each section will progress to the semifinals, with the two semifinal winners meeting in the final.

Teams

The teams that competed in the 2019 Rugby Challenge are:

North Section

Log

 The  and  qualified for the semifinals.

Round-by-round

The table below shows each team's progression throughout the season. For each round, each team's cumulative points total is shown with the overall log position in brackets.

Matches

Round One

Round Two

Round Three

Round Four

Round Five

Round Six

Round Seven

South Section

Log

 The  and  qualified for the semifinals.

Round-by-round

The table below shows each team's progression throughout the season. For each round, each team's cumulative points total is shown with the overall log position in brackets.

Matches

Round One

Round Two

Round Three

Round Four

Round Five

Round Six

Round Seven

Title play-offs

Semifinals

Final

Honours

The honour roll for the 2019 Rugby Challenge was as follows:

Referees

The following referees officiated matches in the 2019 Rugby Challenge:

See also

 2019 Currie Cup Premier Division
 2019 Currie Cup First Division

Notes

References

External links
 SARU website

Rugby Challenge (South Africa)
Rugby Challenge
Rugby Challenge